Citizens to Preserve Overton Park (CPOP) is a nonprofit advocacy group founded in Memphis, Tennessee, in 1957. CPOP is best known for its success at preventing the extension of Interstate 40 through Overton Park adjacent to the Memphis Zoo, through the landmark 1971 Supreme Court case Citizens to Preserve Overton Park v. Volpe.

On March 8, 2008, the organization was reincorporated in response to the Zoo's clear-cutting of a portion of the adjacent Old Forest Arboretum in Overton Park and the enclosing of additional park sections within a security fence in preparation for future expansion.

A year later, in March 2009, CPOP found itself in the public eye once again, opposing plans by the City of Memphis, Tennessee Engineering Division to create a floodwater retention basin in an extensive, flat, and much-used section of Overton Park, the Greensward.

External links
Official website

References

Civic and political organizations of the United States
Environmental organizations based in Tennessee
Organizations based in Memphis, Tennessee
Parks in Memphis, Tennessee
Environmental organizations established in 1957
1957 establishments in Tennessee
Interstate 40